El Retorno del Hombre Lobo (The Return of the Wolfman) is a 1980 Spanish horror film that is the ninth in a 12-film series about the werewolf Count Waldemar Daninsky, played by Paul Naschy. It is also known as The Craving and Night of the Werewolf.

The film was first theatrically released in Spain in April 1981, and was later shown at the 1982 Fantasporto Festival. The film was released theatrically in the U.S. as The Craving in 1985, then released to video as The Craving, and more recently on DVD as Night of the Werewolf. Shout Factory also released it on Blu-ray as part of their "Paul Naschy Collection set.

The film had a much larger budget than previous Naschy werewolf productions. Angel Luis de Diego handled the werewolf makeup and special effects.

Naschy followed this up with a tenth werewolf film, La Bestia y la Espada Magica (The Beast and the Magic Sword'').

Synopsis
In 15th Century Hungary, the werewolf Waldemar Daninsky is sentenced to be executed along with his satanic mistress Elizabeth Bathory and her coven of witches. Since it is nearly impossible to truly kill him, he is left in a kind of living death, with a silver dagger through his heart and an iron mask affixed to his face to keep him from biting. Centuries later, the dagger is removed from his chest by two graverobbers and Daninsky returns to life, and allows a group of travelling college girls to stay at his castle.

One of the girls locates the tomb of the Countess Bathory and is hypnotically forced by the Countess to perform a bloody ritual that brings the Countess back to life. Daninsky falls in love with one of the girls named Karen, and when he realizes the Countess has been revived and is vampirizing the denizens of the area, he turns against his former mistress and her vampire slaves to save Karen.

The end of the film features a classic battle in the crypt between Daninsky and Bathory, and he winds up biting the vampire's throat out. Now out of control, he goes on to bite Karen, but as she dies, she manages to stab Daninsky through the heart again with the silver dagger, thus ending the curse on the man she loves.

Cast
Paul Naschy as Waldemar Daninsky
Julia Saly as Elizabeth Bathory, an evil countess 
Silvia Aguilar as Erika
Azucena Hernández as Karen
Beatriz Elorrieta as Mircaya
 Pilar Alcon as Barbara
 Ramon Centenero as The Professor
 Ricardo Palacios as Veres, a grave robber
 Rafael Hernandez as Yoyo, a grave robber
 Pepe Ruiz as Bandit
 Tito Garcia as Bandit
 David Rocha as Bandit
 Luis Barboo as Sandy - Bandit
 Alexia Loreto as Woman Killed In Stall

References

External links
 
 

Spanish zombie films
Spanish werewolf films
Spanish vampire films
1980 films
1980 horror films
Cultural depictions of Elizabeth Báthory
Waldemar Daninsky series
1980s Spanish-language films
1980s Spanish films